Elite Zexer (born December 4) is an Israeli film director and writer. She is best known for her work on the films Sand Storm, Tasnim and more. In 2016, she won best director and best film at the Ophir Award.

Life and career
Elite grew up in Herzliya, Israel. She holds a BFA and MFA degrees from the Tel Aviv University. She is also working as a professor at the Tel Aviv University.

In 2008, she wrote and directed Take Note, which won the Best Fiction Film Award at the Tel Aviv International Student Film Festival. Her first feature film Sand Storm won the grand jury prize at the 2016 Sundance Film Festival, Ophir Award and it was the Israeli submission for the Oscar entry for 2016.

Filmography

Awards and nominations

See also
 List of submissions to the 89th Academy Awards for Best Foreign Language Film
 List of Israeli submissions for the Academy Award for Best Foreign Language Film

References

External links 
 

Israeli women film directors
Israeli film directors
Living people
Year of birth missing (living people)
People from Netanya
People from Herzliya
Tel Aviv University alumni
Academic staff of Tel Aviv University